Tonbridge Jubilee Sidings are  located in Tonbridge, Kent, England, on the Redhill to Tonbridge Line to the west of Tonbridge station.

Present 
Stabling is provided for Southeastern Class 377 EMUs, Class 375 Electrostars and Class 465 Networkers.

References 

 Railway sidings in England
 Rail transport in Kent